The Studenica Typikon is a Serbian Orthodox typikon written in 1208 by Serbian Archbishop Sava, a member of the Nemanjić dynasty and the first head of the autocephalous Serbian Orthodox Church. The preface includes the Hagiography of St. Simeon, a hagiography (or biography) on his father, Grand Prince Stefan Nemanja, who was canonized.

The Studenica Typikon was based on the typikon of Hilandar Monastery at Mount Athos, and also became the model typikon of Žiča, Sopoćani, Mileševa, Gračanica, and Dečani monasteries.

References

Sources
 
 

13th-century Christian texts
Serbian literature
Serbian books
Serbian manuscripts
Saint Sava
Cyrillic manuscripts
Eastern Orthodox liturgical books